The Union of Francophones (UF) is a political party in Belgium that participates as electoral lists in regional, provincial, and municipal elections in the Flemish Province of Flemish Brabant. As its name suggests, its primary target is the French-speaking community of Flemish Brabant and particularly those who live in the officially Dutch-speaking area Halle-Vilvoorde including the now predominantly French-speaking municipalities with language facilities in the Brussels Periphery. Its main goal is to provide both constitutional exemptions for and privileges to Francophones living in Dutch-speaking Flanders, for example by annexing the municipalities with language facilities to the officially bilingual Brussels-Capital Region.

History
In the 1980s the Groupement des francophones de la Périphérie (GFP) was created, grouping French-speaking elected officials from the Flemish communes of the Brabant province. In 1994 the province of Brabant was divided into the Brussels-Capital Region, Flemish Brabant and Walloon Brabant, leading to the creation of the Union of Francophones in the perspective of the October 1994 provincial elections.

Organization
The UF is a cooperative structure without direct members, run by representatives of 4 French-speaking parties, the Reformist Movement (MR), the Francophone Democratic Federalists (a member of MR until 25 September 2011), the Humanist Democratic Centre and the Socialist Party, plus the elected officials at the regional and provincial levels, and the burgomasters. Its general assembly groups all French-speaking elected officials in the Flemish Brabant.

Programme
As a heterogenous multi-party coalition, the UF doesn't follow a specific ideological point of view. However, reflecting the social composition of the population in these rather privileged suburbs, most of the elected officials belong to the centre-right Reform Movement. The coalition wants an enlargement of the bilingual Brussels Capital Region through the merger of various municipalities with language facilities with a large percentage of Francophone inhabitants, like Sint-Genesius-Rode, to it and opposes the splitting of the partially bilingual Brussels-Halle-Vilvoorde electoral and judicial constituency.

Elected officials
The party currently has one representative in the Flemish Parliament, five in the provincial council of Flemish Brabant and dozens in several municipal councils.

Other French-speaking parties
For the first time the Francophone green party Ecolo took part in some UF lists at the municipal level for the 2006 elections, only in municipalities with language facilities, and got several candidates elected, including an alderman (échevin) in Linkebeek, Franklin Audag. Beforehand the party had always chosen to support the lists of its Flemish counterpart Groen!, with or without the inclusion of an Ecolo candidate. But the party refused to take part in the UF list for the Flemish regional elections in 2009.

Electoral performance
The following table lists the municipalities bordering the Brussels Region and/or bordering one of the six Flemish municipalities with language facilities for French speakers (marked with [F]).

Sources

External links
Official website
Leaflets and posters of the UF (2006, 2009, 2012 and 2014), Tractothèque

Francophone political parties in Belgium